Klaus Lahti (7 July 1909 – 19 December 2003) was a Finnish sports shooter. He competed at the 1948 Summer Olympics and 1952 Summer Olympics.

References

External links
 

1909 births
2003 deaths
Finnish male sport shooters
Olympic shooters of Finland
Shooters at the 1948 Summer Olympics
Shooters at the 1952 Summer Olympics
People from Hollola
Sportspeople from Päijät-Häme